A list of books and essays about Frank Capra:

Individual films
It's a Wonderful Life

Capra